Aircraft Structures Technician is an occupation in the Canadian Forces. Aircraft Structure Technicians (ACS Techs) are responsible for the maintenance and repair of aircraft components and structures.

Background

The Aircraft Structures (ACS) trade was brought about during a time of fiscal constraints for the Canadian Forces. The ACS trade is an amalgamation of three aircraft maintenance trade (Machinist, Aircraft refinisher, and Metal fabrication). The trade was officially integrated into the RCAF in January 1997.

ACS Techs perform multiple aircraft maintenance activities on and off the aircraft, such as sheet metal repair and fabrication, aircraft refinishing, industrial sewing, machining, and composite work. ACS techs can further their skills by applying for Occupational Specialty Qualification courses (OSQ), which can include Quality Assurance Special Metals Welding, advanced composite repair, Helicopter Rotor Blade Repair, and special purpose machining.

ACS techs may also be employed to conduct Elementary Aircraft Servicing tasks such as aircraft towing, aircraft starts, aircraft jacking, before flight check (B-Check), after flight checks (A-Check), as well as replenishing aircraft systems including fuels, lubricants, hydraulics, and all aircraft technical administration (paperwork).

Eligibility and educational objectives

ACS techs must have successfully passed the 13-week Basic Military Qualification (BMQ) course at the Canadian Forces Leadership and Recruit School in Saint-Jean-sur-Richelieu, Quebec. After graduating from BMQ, potential ACS techs will then conduct a 4-week Developmental Phase 2 (DP2) "Common Core" Course at the Canadian Forces School of Aerospace Technology and Engineering (CFSATE) as well as a 4-week "Basic Electrical Training" (BET) course.

Upon completion of the aforementioned courses, potential Aircraft Structures (ACS) Technicians will attend a 65-week-long course at CFSATE located at Canadian Forces Base (CFB) Borden, Ontario. This course covers everything they will need to perform their job once they are assigned to a Unit. The course is designed to provide the technician with the basic skill set required to perform elementary tasks. Some of the topics covered are; user maintenance on tools and equipment, aircraft servicing duties, corrosion control, protective coatings and markings, textiles, machining, welding, aircraft structural repairs, and composites and plastics.

Maintenance authorizations

Upon completion of the ACS course, ACS techs will be posted to a Royal Canadian Air Force Unit and begin their apprenticeship. The apprenticeship will last between 18 and 24 months, where they will have to complete their Apprenticeship Log Book. The Log Book consists of 22 task areas with numerous sub tasks that must be completed before they achieve Performance of Maintenance (POM). Due to the inexperience of all new apprentices, ACS apprentices must be supervised by a qualified peer or supervisor while they are conducting aircraft maintenance repairs.

Performance of Maintenance (POM) is the ability to be able to work by yourself and "sign" for your work, however, all POM work projects must be inspected and the paperwork can then be closed by the qualified technician. POM's are also the working force of the trade. After 4 years of working on aircraft, showing confidence, and the ability to perform aircraft maintenance properly, POM's can be recommended for Level "A" authorization.

"A" Level is the authorization that allows a POM to sign for work and apprentices work. Level "A" Signatories typically tend to do more paperwork than hands on work as they are required to inspect all POM paperwork. The Level "A" signature certifies that the POM conducted a safe repair and that the associated paperwork is filled out completely and properly. As the Level "A" personnel are the only ones who can be granted the assessors authorization, they are also the teaching force for ACS Apprentices. Assessors are the only personnel who can sign off apprentice sub tasks as well as task areas, thus assessing their development as a technician.

Working environment

ACS techs typically work in shops and on hangar floors, but can also find themselves on ships, in the field, or on deployment to the Arctic or throughout the World. Repairs for some Aircraft Structures can be difficult to access, so aircraft stands, awkward positions, or confined space entry may be required. ACS techs are required to lift and move heavy stock, materials, parts and equipment, and are regularly required to work long hours in a standing position, sometimes wearing full chemical suits with boots, gloves, and respirator, inside a heated paint booth.

Occupational Hazards

ACS techs regularly come in contact with hazardous chemicals and materials, which include: Polyurethane paints, Methyl Ethyl Ketone (MEK), Zinc chromate paint primers, oils, jet fuel, paint strippers, and paint thinners. ACS techs are also exposed to noise, fumes, dust, odors, carcinogenic materials, and UV (welding) flashes. ACS techs use personal protective equipment (PPE) to reduce the risk of injury, but additional medical tests are used to monitor a technicians health above what is standard for most other Canadian Forces trades.

Conclusion

ACS technicians are a vital part of the Royal Canadian Air Force Aircraft Maintenance platform. They are always having to adapt their skills with the advancements in the Aerospace Industries. ACS techs are currently in the process of taking over the Aircraft Life Support Equipment (ALSE) from the Aviation Technician Trade in an attempt to be more deployable. By doing this the trade is almost doubling its numbers from 460 to 860 technicians Forces wide.

See also

Royal Canadian Air Force
Canadian Forces School of Aerospace Technology and Engineering - CFSATE

References

External links
https://web.archive.org/web/20130523005947/http://rcaf-arc.forces.gc.ca/itp-pfi/page-eng.asp?id=940
https://web.archive.org/web/20121130114830/http://forces.ca/en/job/aircraftstructurestechnician-52#education-2
https://web.archive.org/web/20120929224912/http://www.rcaf-arc.forces.gc.ca/16w-16e/schools-ecoles/page-eng.asp?id=640
Canadian Forces Recruiting Centre - Aircraft Structures Tech

Canadian Armed Forces
Royal Canadian Air Force